is a 2013 anime television series produced by Tatsunoko Production. It is the fifth Japanese-produced animation project based on the original 1972 anime series Science Ninja Team Gatchaman, and is directed by Kenji Nakamura. The series aired on NTV between July 12 and September 27, 2013 and was simulcast by Crunchyroll. A second season, titled Gatchaman Crowds insight, started airing on July 4, 2015.

The first season has been licensed by Sentai Filmworks and is streaming on The Anime Network. The second season will be streamed on Hulu, starting with a special episode to air on June 20, 2015.

For the first season, the opening theme is "Crowds" by White Ash whilst the ending theme is "Innocent Note" by Maaya Uchida.


Gatchaman Crowds

Gatchaman Crowds Insight

References

Gatchaman episodes
Gatchaman Crowds